Donald Blaine Huffines is an American politician and businessman from the state of Texas. Huffines co-owns and operates Huffines Communities, a real estate development company in the Dallas–Fort Worth metroplex. A conservative, Tea Party Republican, Huffines represented District 16 in the Texas Senate from 2015 to 2019. He lost his re-election campaign in 2018.

Remaining active in politics, Huffines ran for Governor of Texas in the 2022 Republican primary, challenging incumbent Greg Abbott.

Background

Early life, education, and family 

Don Huffines is a fifth-generation Texan born in Dallas on April 26, 1958. He has two older brothers, James and Ray, and an identical twin brother, Phillip. In his childhood, his brothers and he spent time assisting at their grandfather’s car dealership. Don Huffines' grandfather, James Lecil "J.L." Huffines, started the Huffines Motor Company in Denton, Texas, in 1924. The company has grown into a large network of metroplex dealerships run by Don's brother, Ray Huffines.

Huffines graduated from the University of Texas at Austin with a B.B.A in finance.

Huffines and his wife of 35 years, Mary Catherine, have five children and five grandchildren.

Real-estate career 
Huffines and his brother Phillip are the founders and co-owners of Huffines Communities, a real-estate company established in 1985 that is located in the Dallas/Fort Worth area.

Texas Senate

In 2014, Huffines ran for a seat in the Texas State Senate. He challenged the incumbent of Senate District 16, Senator John J. Carona, in the Republican primary. Huffines ran to the right of Carona, claiming Carona was not a true conservative, and ultimately won the primary against him on March 4, 2014. A combined total of $6.3 million was spent by both candidates in the primary race.

In the November 4 general election, Huffines ran unopposed.  Huffines campaigned on the themes of teaching creationism in public schools, term limits, school choice, funding highway construction, opposing new toll roads, and cutting taxes.

Huffines is the only elected Austin officeholder in Texas history that never took any money from the state; no salary, pension, or reimbursements. Huffines' position is he works for the people, not the government.

Tenure 
During his time in office, Huffines authored, but did not pass, many bills addressing Republican priorities. These bills included legislation on constitutional carry, term limits, and anti-abortion policy. Huffines consistently voted along his party line on conservative legislation; political science fellow Mark Jones named Huffines the fourth-most conservative member of the 2017 Texas Senate. In 2017, Huffines proposed a bill, which did not pass, that would have required 30% voter turnout for any bond election in Texas to be successful. At the time, most such elections drew fewer than 10% of voters to the polls. The San Antonio Express-News claimed that were Huffines' bill to become law, it would make a successful bond election nearly impossible in Texas.

Huffines is known for advocating the elimination of a government agency called Dallas County Schools that reportedly mismanaged taxpayer money. Six people were thrown in prison after being exposed for their roles in the scheme.

On November 6, 2018, Huffines lost his re-election bid to Democrat Nathan M. Johnson, who was the first Democrat to win Senate District 16 in over three decades. Huffines received 45.9% of the vote. Huffines has never defeated a Democrat in an election.

2022 Gubernatorial Candidacy 
Huffines remained politically active after losing his Senate re-election campaign. He was critical of Governor Greg Abbott's response to the COVID-19 pandemic, specifically lockdowns, and called for the reopening of the state.

On May 10, 2021, Huffines announced that he would challenge Abbott in the 2022 Republican primary for governor of Texas. As a candidate, Huffines has warned of an alleged communist invasion of Californians moving to Texas and has advocated to bring prayer back to schools and dared "the Supreme Court to come to Texas to enforce the separation of church and state."

In August 2021, Huffines accused Abbott of using tax dollars to "advocate for transgender ideology". Huffines criticized a webpage run by a state agency overseen by Governor Abbott that spoke about gender identity to children and encouraged them to "express their identities as early as 3 or 4 years of age." This webpage was promptly taken down.

In October 2021, Huffines' campaign also claimed that Critical race theory was in a state agencies' training materials.

On March 1, 2022, Huffines lost the Republican primary, placing third with 12% of the vote against Abbott. Huffines conceded within an hour of the polls closing.

Huffines Liberty Foundation 
In June 2022, Huffines launched the Huffines Liberty Foundation. The mission of the Huffines Liberty Foundation is to advance the cause of liberty in the State of Texas and educate citizens to hold their elected officials accountable.

The Liberty Foundation focuses on securing the Texas border, eliminating school property taxes, and furthering  education freedom through comprehensive research papers.

The Huffines Liberty Foundation released its first publication in October 2022.

Election history

2022

2018

2014

References

21st-century American politicians
Businesspeople from Texas
Living people
McCombs School of Business alumni
People from Dallas
People from Greenville, Texas
Republican Party Texas state senators
Year of birth missing (living people)